Mittagspitze or Mittagsspitze is the name of several mountains:

 Mittagspitze (2332 m), Karwendel, Tyrol, Austria
 Mittagsspitze (2052 m), Sarntal Alps, South Tyrol, Italy
 Mittagspitze (Hindelang) (1682 m), Allgäu Alps, Bavaria, Germany
 Bludenzer Mittagspitze (2107 m), Rätikon, Vorarlberg, Austria
 Damülser Mittagsspitze (2095 m), Bregenz Forest Mountains, Vorarlberg, Austria
 Tschaggunser Mittagspitze (2168 m), Rätikon, Vorarlberg, Austria